Turkish football clubs have participated in European football competitions since 1956, when Galatasaray  took part in the European Cup. In total, 33 Turkish clubs have participated in European competitions to date. The greatest success was achieved when Galatasaray won the UEFA Cup and UEFA Super Cup in 2000.

Achievements

‡ Galatasaray was one of the final eight teams of the 1993–94 UEFA Champions League group stage.
# Inter–Cities Fairs Cup

Overall standing in UEFA competitions
As of 1 September 2022

Legend: 
GF = Goals For. GA = Goals Against. GD = Goal Difference.
EC = European Cup; UCL = UEFA Champions League; UC = UEFA Cup; UEL = UEFA Europa League; CWC = UEFA Cup Winners' Cup; UIC = UEFA Intertoto Cup.

Appearances in UEFA Super Cup

Overall

UEFA Super Cup Performances

Appearances in UEFA Champions League

Chronological order of participations

Table correct as of 7 December 2021.

Standings
As of 1 September 2022

Legend: 
GF = Goals For. GA = Goals Against. GD = Goal Difference.

Note: Matches played before group stage are not included.

Positions in Group Stage

Table correct as of 7 December 2021.

UEFA Champions League/European Cup Performances
Note: Clubs in bold won the corresponding competition that season.

1 Nice won 5–1 in a play-off to qualify for the quarter-finals.

2 Zürich advanced to the second round over Galatasaray by winning a coin toss, after their play-off match ended 2–2.

3Due to the Russian invasion of Ukraine, Ukrainian teams are required to play their home matches at neutral venues until further notice.

Appearances in UEFA Cup/UEFA Europa League

Note: Clubs in bold won the corresponding competition that season.

1UEFA ordered Trabzonspor's home leg on 14 September to be played behind closed doors after objects were thrown at visiting fans and the fourth official, and a smoke bomb ignited in the stands, during their second qualifying round home leg against Cypriots APOEL. Trabzonspor appealed, and UEFA rejected the appeal on 13 September. Trabzonspor's penalty includes a second closed-doors game, a penalty which has been deferred for two years and will be removed if no further incidents occur.
Turkey (TUR): Fenerbahçe, the 2010–11 Süper Lig champions, was banned by the Turkish Football Federation on 24 August 2011 from participating in the 2011–12 UEFA Champions League due to the ongoing investigation into match-fixing. UEFA decided to replace them in the 2011–12 UEFA Champions League with Trabzonspor, the league runners-up, who had lost in the Champions League third qualifying round and were participating in the Europa League play-off round at that time. They finished third in their group and thus advanced to the 2011–12 UEFA Europa League knockout phase.

Appearances in UEFA Europa Conference League
Note: Clubs in bold won the corresponding competition that season.

Appearances in non-UEFA competitions
As of 13 August 2017

Legend: GF = Goals For. GA = Goals Against. GD = Goal Difference.

See also
Turkish football clubs in European competitions 1990–99

References

External links
UEFA Website
Rec.Sport.Soccer Statistics Foundation

 
European football clubs in international competitions